Zhukovsky , formerly (and still occasionally) known as Ramenskoye is an international airport, located in Moscow Oblast, Russia,  southeast of central Moscow, in the city of Zhukovsky, a few kilometers south-east of the closed Bykovo Airport.

History

The airfield assigned to the newly established in 1941 Flight Research Institute has served as a major USSR aircraft testing establishment, with most of the major Russian OKBs having facilities there. This airfield was used as a test site for the Soviet Buran Spacecraft. It was also used by the Ministry of Emergency Situations and cargo carriers. Until June 2006, jet fighters flights for the public and international customers were available at the Gromov Flight Research Institute airfield (a number of two-seater jets like: Aero L-39 Albatros, Mikoyan-Gurevich MiG-25 Foxbat, for Edge of Space flights, Mikoyan MiG-29 Fulcrum, etc.).

On March 29, 2011, then Russian prime minister Vladimir Putin proposed moving all charter and low-cost flights to Ramenskoye Airport (as it was then called) to relieve Moscow's Sheremetyevo, Domodedovo, and Vnukovo airports and reduce the cost of tickets.
A new terminal was constructed and the airport scheduled to be opened on 16 March 2016, but was later postponed due to lack of interest and airport certification issues.
Originally named the same as the airfield after the nearby city of Ramenskoye, the airport was officially renamed after the city of Zhukovsky, in which it is geographically situated, and opened on 30 May 2016. The opening ceremony was attended by Russian Prime Minister Dmitry Medvedev.

The Joint Venture "Ramport Aero" running the airport is formed by Lithuania's Avia Solutions Group (75%) and Russia state corporation Rostec (25%), who aimed to expand the airport in three stages. While the opening of the new airport was delayed and aircraft limit to Ramenskoye is implemented, Air France-KLM noted it tends to use Ramenskoye as a diversion airport to Sheremetyevo in case of emergency.

The airfield is also publicly well known as a place of the biennial MAKS Airshow.

Airport establishment 

According to the development project of the international airport, in the period up to 2019, it is planned to build two passenger terminals (with a capacity of 2 million and 5 million passengers per year), a hotel with 250 rooms, office buildings, open parking for 1,240 parking spaces and covered parking, with a capacity of up to 7,426 cars, as well as the station for aeroexpress. The first phase of the new airport in 2016 will have to serve 1.7 million people, and by 2020 the project assumes an increase in passenger traffic to 10.8 million.

In 2015, the construction of the first passenger terminal with an area of 17.6 thousand square meters was carried out. and adaptation of the current infrastructure of the Ramenskoye airfield for civil aviation purposes. The annual capacity of the first terminal will reach two million passengers a year. Investments in the project to launch the first stage of the airport amount to more than 1.5 billion rubles ($27 million).

In total, over 13 years, approximately 13 billion rubles will be invested in the airport and over 240 thousand square meters of airport infrastructure will be built. At the second and third stages, it is planned to significantly expand the first one and build the second passenger terminal of Zhukovsky airport. After completion of all stages of development, the total area of the terminals will be 60 thousand square meters. m., and their capacity will increase to 12 million passengers a year.

However, there are other estimates: due to the fact that the airspace Zhukovsky airport intersects with the zone Domodedovo airport, passenger traffic will be 12 times more modest.

The development of the project includes a significant improvement in transport infrastructure in the area. However, residents of the city of Zhukovsky fear that the development of the airport will lead to a worsening of the transport situation due to an increase in automobile traffic within the city, as well as a decrease in the comfort of living of residents due to the noise of airplanes when the airport operates around the clock.

In October 2018, Avia Solutions Group (ASG), sold its share of the airport management company to the management of Ramport Aero

Airlines and destinations

The following airlines operate regular and scheduled services to and from Zhukovsky:

Statistics

Surface transport

Rail 
The nearest railway station to Zhukovsky Airport is Otdykh station. There is no direct rail connection between Moscow and the airport. Express electric train "Sputnik" from Moscow Kazansky railway station to Otdykh station with two stops. There are 26 services from 7:00 to 23:00 on weekdays at irregular intervals, no services at weekends. Travel time: 37 minutes. Passengers can also take an ordinary suburban train along Ryazanskiy direction to Otdykh station. Buses depart from Otdykh railway station to Zhukovsky airport. Departure 8 minutes after Sputnik arrival. Travel time: 20 minutes. From the Otdykh railway station, there are buses to the airport, interval: 30 minutes or by bus routes 2, 6 to the stop "Pereezd".

Bus  
A direct route from Kotelniki station of the Moscow Metro to Zhukovsky International Airport is bus No. 441 "Kotelniki metro station" - "Airport Zhukovsky". The interval varies starting from 12 minutes depending on traffic, travel time 64 minutes.

Accidents and incidents 

See also
List of the busiest airports in Russia 
List of the busiest airports in Europe
List of the busiest airports in the former USSR

References

External links

  
 Airport parameters

Airports built in the Soviet Union
Airports in Moscow Oblast
Airports established in 2016
Rostec
Companies based in Moscow Oblast
2016 establishments in Russia